Coating is a process that consists of applying a liquid or a powder into the surface of an edible product to convey new (usually sensory) properties. Coating designates an operation as much as the result of it: the application of a layer and the layer itself.  Coating takes different meanings depending on the industry concerned.

Definitions
This article concerns coating applications in the food industry.  There are many similarities between coating processes and numerous examples of technology transfer to and from the food industry.

Coating in the food industry is the application of a layer of liquids or solids onto a product. The operation essentially relies on mechanical energy. It consists mostly in setting the product particles in motion and simultaneously applying the coating ingredient in a certain pattern to expose one to the other. It involves such phenomena as adhesion, friction, viscosity, surface tension and crystallisation. Food coating  is not a “hard” science such as drying or cooling, which can be described by equations and are predictable. Food coating is rather a “soft” knowledge derived from the accumulation of know-how. One reason is that the product and the ingredients considered have complex characteristics, variations and interactions.

Encapsulation is the application of a liquid layer to very small particles. It relies on an array of principles: entrapping a molecule inside a matrix, chemical bonding, and polymerisation. Encapsulation aims at the protection and controlled release of active molecules when immersed in an environment.  As a rule of thumb,  particle size can  discriminate between “encapsulation” (below 300 µm to 1000 µm) and “food coating” (above this limit). Mere mechanical movement is not adequate and sufficient to fulfill the proper coating of minute particles.

Objectives of coating

Coatings can be added for the enhancement of organoleptic properties of a food product.
Appearance and palatability can be improved by adding color (white dragee, brown chocolate), changing the surface aspect (glazed sweets or rough, crispy nuggets); changing or adding tastes (sweet dragee, salted snack) or flavours (fruit-glazed sweet goods), or texture (breaded crispy nuggets).

Coatings also can be used to add vitamins and minerals (enriched white rice) or food energy.

Coating conveys functional properties, such as particle separation (oiled dry fruit, shredded cheese), antioxidant effect (fruit cubes), or a barrier effect [water migration between a layer of ice cream and a biscuit (cookie) or against moisture loss of chewing gum].  Barrier effects are often difficult to achieve.

An ingredient may be cheaper than the product it coats and thus allows for a slight cost reduction.

The coating process
The coating process begins with the application of the coating on the food product, but the end product must be stable throughout its shelf life. Therefore, a coating process is completed by a stabilizing process, either by freezing, cooling, heating or drying. The sequences of this process are:

Application: To apply minute quantities of an ingredient, spraying is used to disperse it first, instead of just pouring it. This hastens the dispersion on the whole surface of the product. For larger ratios of coating to substrate, mixing or dipping can be used.  Multiple stages also can be used; breaded meats, for example, may have a dry application (predust) followed by a wet batter dip and then another dry crumb application.
Adhesion: the coating must adhere to the product, meaning there must be a degree of affinity between the ingredient and the product.
Coalescence: in case of a liquid, the multiple droplets may merge to form a uniform continuous layer. Characteristics of the ingredient in relation to the product, such as viscosity and surface tension associated to a mechanical effect (friction) are critical.
Stabilisation : depending on the nature of the coating ingredient(s) and substrate product, the ingredient is stabilised by elimination of the solvent (drying and evaporation of water, alcohol), crystallisation (sugar crystallises when water is evaporated, fat crystallises when cooled), or thermal treatment (proteins set irreversibly when heated).

A coating process can be broken into the following elements:
 Inputs: base product, additives and ingredients
 Additional flows: air as a carrier of product or ingredient, or for drying, energy in a mechanical (agitation, transfer, friction) or a thermal form (convection, conduction or radiation heating)
 Outputs: end product, excess of coating ingredient, lost or to be recycled
Collaterals occur along the process:
 Breakage of product
 Generation of fines (small particles)
 Agglomeration of products
 Clogging of system surfaces with product or ingredient
 Airborne pollution, volatile organic component
These effects generally are to be avoided unless the end product is made more desirable.

Parameters affecting the system are listed by origin:

This first set of criteria governs the choice of the coating ingredient. The coating consists either in a single ingredient or a mix. This mix has different physical forms: solution, emulsion, suspension, powder, etc. It has its own characteristics. In addition, a fluid may be required such as spraying, cooling, heating or drying air.

The combination of the above characteristics drives the choice  of the process principle. It has then to be precisely described.

The selection of the proper process and its control rely on the gathering of precise and reliable information.

The influence of some phenomena and their parameters is critical: crystallisation, water removal (drying), glass transition, viscosity, or surface tension.

Among the parameters, temperature has a choice place. It influences viscosity, surface tension, drying or crystallisation behaviour. Ultimately, it influences the coating rate (thickness, weight gain) and coating resistance. It therefore influences the degree of clogging of product and ingredient in the system.
For example, fat will tend to set preferably on a cool product if the system wall is kept at a higher temperature.

Practice

Coating ingredients

Coating techniques
For the sake of classification, two categories can be split easily into batch or continuous processes. Then, the categories can be refined according to the way the product is set in motion and the ingredient applied. Then, techniques allow either for just coating or can combine coating and setting in the same equipment.

Criteria for the selection of a technique 
 Base product characteristics: shape, size, bulk density.  Size is the first criterion.
 Mechanical resistance of the base product
 Final thickness of the coating layer
 Complete/partial, top/side/bottom coating
 Number of sequences to repeat
 Processing time for each sequence
 Setting mode: drying, cooling, freezing
 Capacity
 Preferred batch or continuous system

Comparison batch vs. Continuous
The demand for higher yields makes production managers want to shift from manual batch to continuous automated systems. One has to consider the pros and contras prior to go for a costly and risky decision.

Peripherals

Given the number of operations and steps, a coating process can be an extensive process considered as a whole. The process core machine requires peripherals to serve it. A few frequent ones are listed for information.
 Storage
 Ingredient preparation
 Product feeding and metering
 Ingredient dosing
 Filtration or sieving
 Application system
 Recycling

Measures
Test results can be immediately evaluated  (visual aspect) but are preferably assessed by careful measures : to allow monitoring, to agree on commissioning, to certify conformity with customer requirements.

Typical measures :

 Optical : colour, microscopy (homogeneity, thickness), image analysis
 Weighing : weighing before and after treatment, weighing between batches or individual particles
 Specific  measurements according to target : compaction, barrier property

See also 

 Food processing

References

Coatings
Food processing